Ahmed Ben Bella (25 December 1918 – 11 April 2012) was an Algerian politician, soldier and socialist revolutionary who served as the head of government of Algeria from 27 September 1962 to 15 September 1963 and then the first president of Algeria from 15 September 1963 to 19 June 1965.

Youth
Ahmed Ben Bella was born in Maghnia, in the former department of Oran, western Algeria, to Moroccan parents, on 25 December 1918, during the height of the French colonial period.

Ben Bella was the son of a farmer and small businessman; he had five brothers and two sisters. His oldest brother died from wounds received in the First World War, during which he fought for France. Another brother died from illness and a third disappeared in France in 1940, during the mayhem of the Nazi victory.

Ben Bella began his studies in Maghnia, where he went to the French school, and continued them in the city of Tlemcen, where he first became aware of racial discrimination. Disturbed by the animus against Muslims expressed by his European teacher, he began chafing against imperialism and colonialism and criticized the domination of French cultural influence over Algeria. During this period, he joined the nationalist movement.

Service with French Army
Ben Bella first volunteered for service in the French Army in 1936. The Army was one of the few avenues of advancement for Algerians under colonial rule and voluntary enlistment was common. Posted to Marseille, he played center midfield for Olympique de Marseille in 1939–1940. His only appearance for the club was in a game against FC Antibes in the Coupe de France on 29 April 1940 in Cannes, during which he scored a goal. Club officials offered him a professional spot on the team, but he rejected the offer. He also played for IRB Maghnia.

Ben Bella enlisted again in 1940, believing that the French Army offered the best opportunity for non-discriminatory treatment of Algerians. Fighting for France during the Second World War, he was decorated twice, receiving the Croix de Guerre after manning an anti-aircraft post during the Nazi invasion in 1940. He was demobilised after the fall of France, but joined a Free French regiment of Moroccan tirailleurs (infantry) with whom he saw service throughout the Italian campaign. In Italy, he was decorated for bravery demonstrated at the Battle of Monte Cassino, during which he dragged a wounded commissioned officer to safety, assuming control of his battalion. For this, he was promoted to the rank of warrant officer and received the Médaille militaire, the highest decoration of the Free French forces, directly from Charles de Gaulle.

On 8 May 1945, while France was celebrating Germany's surrender, widespread protests erupted in the Algerian town of Sétif. The war had intensified colonial repression of the Algerians, prompting a backlash that led to the deaths of more than 100 Europeans and around 1,500 Algerians, according to official reports. Anti-colonial insurgents, however, put the number of Algerian deaths at around 10,000. The fallout from the Sétif uprising shocked Ben Bella and his Algerian companions, as they realized that France would not recognize their claim to equal treatment despite their wartime service.

Before independence

First organization for an uprising against the French regime in Algeria
After the events in Setif, Ben Bella returned to Algeria, becoming politically active in the opposition movement against the French regime. French authorities sent assailants with the intention of assassinating him on his farm. 

The attempt against his life failed, but the farm was confiscated and he went into hiding. After the nationalist parties had achieved great success in local elections in 1947, by this was followed by the fixing of the Algerian Assembly elections in 1948 by French officials, agreed to and justified by the Socialist Governor-General Marcel-Edmond Naegelen, Ben Bella became convinced that achieving democratic independence through peaceful means was illusory. Together with Messali Hadj and his party, he helped to found the Organisation Spéciale (OS), a paramilitary organization whose strategic aim was to take up arms against the French colonial regime as quickly as possible. This group became the immediate predecessor of the National Liberation Front. 

In 1949, Ben Bella was involved in the robbing of the central post office in Oran to gain funds for the organization. He was eventually caught in 1951 and sentenced to eight years' imprisonment in Blida jail. He escaped soon afterwards, making his way to Tunisia and then to Egypt, reaching Cairo by 1952.

At the outbreak of the Algerian War in 1954, Ben Bella was based in Cairo, where he had become one of the nine members of the Revolutionary Committee of Unity and Action that headed the Front de Liberation Nationale (FLN), founded in November that year during a secret meeting of Algerian leaders in Switzerland. The FLN soon began armed insurrection against the French colonists, which became a guerilla war in Algeria.

Algerian War

Ben Bella played an important role during the war, leading the FLN, organizing the shipment of foreign weapons and coordinating political strategy. Although he was not present in Algeria, attempts against his life persisted. In 1956, he refused to receive a package delivered by taxi to his hotel in Cairo. A bomb exploded inside the taxi as it drove away, killing the driver. 

That same year, while in his hotel in Tripoli, a French gunman entered his room and fired, wounding but not killing him. The shooter was later killed by guards while fleeing, at the Libyan border. In October 1956, he was arrested in Algiers by French military authorities, who hijacked the plane on which he was flying. He was kept prisoner until the Evian accords in 1962, and released on 5 July. 

After national independence, he was named vice president of Algeria in Benyoucef Benkhedda's cabinet. 

His arrest earlier had led to the resignation of Alain Savary, who was opposed to Guy Mollet's policies; as a prisoner during the height of the FLN terror campaign, he remained relatively untarnished by his association with the organization.

Like many Arab revolutionaries of the time, he came to describe himself as a "Nasserist" and developed close ties to Egypt even before national independence was achieved. Nasser's material, moral and political support of the Algerian movement became a source of geopolitical trouble for Egypt, as it played a major role in France's decision to wage war against him during the 1956 Suez Crisis.

Due to Pakistan's support for the FLN, Ben Bella had been given a Pakistani diplomatic passport to make his foreign travels possible in the face of an international manhunt co-ordinated by the French and their allies.
 

Ben Bella also traveled on a Pakistani diplomatic passport during the years of his exile from Algeria in the 1980s.

Algerian independence

Ben Bella's government

After Algeria's independence, Ben Bella quickly became a popular leader. In June 1962, he challenged the leadership of the premier, Benyoucef Benkhedda. This led to several disputes among his rivals in the FLN, which were quickly suppressed by Ben Bella's rapidly growing number of supporters, most notably within the armed forces, whose chief was Houari Boumédiènne. Boumédiènne marched his supporter troops to Algiers and Ben Bella seized power on 4 August in a coup d'état. By September 1962, Bella was in control of Algeria in all but name. He was elected premier in a one-sided election on 20 September, which was recognized by the United States on 29 September. Algeria was admitted as the 109th member of the United Nations on 8 October 1962.

As prime minister, Ben Bella arranged to legalize the seizures of autogestion spontaneously undertaken by Algerian workers. In March 1963, he drew up (with his circle of advisers) a set of decrees to nationalize all previously European-owned land. In his words, the "Tripoli program remained a dead letter, and independence and revolution made no sense, as long as Algerian soil was in hands of the big landowners". 

He used his position to push for the approval of the constitution drawn up by the FLN, and alienated allies. Mohammed Khider and Ferhat Abbas resigned their political offices in 1963, dismayed by the dictatorial tendencies on display in Ben Bella's proposed constitution, which enshrined a one-party state and rejected political pluralism. Nevertheless, this action presented no problem to the Algerian people: the constitution was approved and, on 15 September 1963, Ben Bella was elected president of the country, unopposed and with an immense majority.

During his presidency, Ben Bella was confronted with the challenge of building a postcolonial state infrastructure from the ground up; the country had no independent state traditions and its senior civil servants had always been staffed by the French. Despite a predisposition toward an egalitarian way of governing and a lifestyle lacking in extravagance (he did not live in the governor's palace, and maintained an open-door policy with Algerian citizens), Ben Bella's actions in government did not always match his intentions. After stabilizing the country, he embarked on a series of initially popular but chaotically handled land reforms for the benefit of landless farmers, and increasingly turned to socialist rhetoric. 

His policy of autogestion, or self-management, was adopted after Algerian peasants seized former French lands and was inspired by Marxist Yugoslavian leader Josip Broz Tito. He also worked on the development of his country, instituting reforms, undertaking campaigns for national literacy, and nationalizing several industries and calling for socialization of the economy and Arabization. 

On many occasions, however, he improvised government policy as he went, as with his National Solidarity Fund, for which he asked the Algerian people to "voluntarily" hand over jewellery and banknotes.

In international relations, he had to maintain connections with the former colonial master France, and also accepted economic aid from both the U.S. and the Soviet Union, as each sought to move his regime into its orbit and into opposition to the other. At the same time, Ben Bella wished Algeria to become a leader of Third World liberation movements and of the Third World itself. In order to strengthen relations with other colonies and former colonies, Algeria joined the Non-Aligned Movement under Ben Bella’s regime, and he forged links with such African leaders as Gamal Abdel Nasser, Kwame Nkrumah, Modibo Keita and Sekou Toure to aid rebel movements throughout Africa. 

He also established good relations with Fidel Castro, Che Guevara and Cuba. After his 1962 visit, Cuba sent a health mission to Algeria, with doctors and medical help, and later sent weapons and soldiers as aid during the Sand War against Morocco. He was awarded the title Hero of the Soviet Union on 30 April 1964.

During his tenure, Ben Bella encountered political struggles with former leaders of the FLN, including Mohammed Khider, Ferhat Abbas, Mohammed Boudiaf and Hocine Aït Ahmed. Ahmed founded the Front des Forces Socialistes (Socialist Forces Front) (FFS) to confront Ben Bella, and the others joined after being alienated by Ben Bella's dictatorial leadership. In 1963, the FFS called for an armed revolt against the regime. However, it had force only in the Kabylia region, and by the summer of 1964 the revolt was controlled and FFS leaders were arrested.

In addition to political resistance, Ben Bella faced religious opposition. The Association of the Algerian Ulema claimed that the "state Islam" that Ben Bella wanted to achieve was not an application of true Muslim values, but rather an attempt to please the population.

His government was overthrown in June 1965 while he was planning to host an Afro-Asian international meeting, in a bloodless coup led by his defense minister Houari Boumédiène. He was held for eight months in an underground prison, then for the next 14 years lived under house arrest.

House arrest and later freedom
After being deposed in 1965, Ben Bella was detained for eight months in prison. He was then transferred to an isolated villa in Birouta, where he was placed under house arrest for 14 years. He was, however, permitted a private life there, and in 1971 he married Zhora Sellami, an Algerian journalist; their meeting was arranged by Ben Bella’s mother. They became religiously observant Muslims, and adopted two girls, Mehdia and Nouria. After Boumedienne's death in 1978, restrictions on him were eased in July 1979, and he was freed on 30 October 1980. Ben Bella briefly resided in France but was then expelled in 1983. He moved to Lausanne, Switzerland, and launched the Mouvement pour la Démocratie en Algérie (MDA), a moderate Islamic opposition party, in 1984. In September 1990, he returned to Algeria, and, in 1991, led the MDA in the first round of the country's abortive parliamentary elections. The MDA was banned in 1997.

Later life
In 2003, Ben Bella was elected president of the International Campaign Against Aggression on Iraq at its Cairo Conference. He described himself numerous times in interviews as an Islamist of a "mild and peace-loving flavour", Despite his former one-party state he later vocally advocated for democracy in Algeria. He described the militant tendency arising in the Islamic world as having developed from an incorrect and faulty interpretation of Islam. Despite controversies, he was respected for his role in the anti-colonial struggle and was seen by many Arab intellectuals as one of the last original Arab nationalists.

He was also the chairperson of the African Union Panel of the Wise, which is mandated to advise the AU Commission on issues relevant to conflict prevention, management and resolution. The other members of the panel at the time were President Miguel Trovoada (former President of São Tomé and Príncipe), Dr. Salim A. Salim (former Secretary-General of the OAU), Dr. Brigalia Bam (Chair of South Africa's Electoral Commission) and Elisabeth Pognon (former President of the Constitutional Court of Benin).

Illness, death and state funeral
In February 2012, Ben Bella was admitted to a hospital for medical checks. At the same time, a report circulated that he had died, but this was denied by his family.

Ben Bella died on 11 April 2012 at his family home in Algiers. Though the reasons of his death were unknown, he had been treated for respiratory illnesses twice at Ain Naadja. His body lay in state on 12 April before the funeral at El Alia Cemetery on 13 April. Algeria declared eight days of national mourning.

Heads of state and government present at state funeral

References

Further reading
Aussaresses, General Paul, The Battle of the Casbah: Terrorism and Counter-Terrorism in Algeria, 1955–1957. New York: Enigma Books, 2010. 978-1-929631-30-8.

External links

Ben Bella's biography from rulers.org
Profile of the ruler
French Biography
BBC on 20 June 1965 – on the coup against Ben Bella.
New York Times obituary dated 11 April 2012
Che Guevara, Cuba, And The Algerian Revolution by Ahmed ben Bella, The Militant, Vol. 62 / no 4, 2 February 1998
BritanicaAcademic Ahmed Ben Bella, by Robert Merle
Ahmed Ben Bella, Revolutionary Who Led Algeria After Independence, Dies at 93

|-

1916 births
2012 deaths
Algerian Arab nationalists
Algerian emigrants to France
Algerian emigrants to Switzerland
Algerian escapees
Algerian footballers
Algerian Muslims
Algerian people imprisoned abroad
Algerian people of Moroccan descent
Algerian prisoners and detainees
Algerian revolutionaries
Algerian socialists
Foreign Heroes of the Soviet Union
French military personnel of World War II
Heads of government who were later imprisoned
Algerian independence activists
IRB Maghnia players
Leaders ousted by a coup
Members of the National Liberation Front (Algeria)
Nasserists
National Liberation Front (Algeria) politicians
Olympique de Marseille players
People from Maghnia
People with acquired Pakistani citizenship
Presidents of Algeria
Vice presidents of Algeria
Recipients of the Croix de Guerre 1939–1945 (France)
Association football midfielders
Algerian sportsperson-politicians
Algerian Islamists
Muslim socialists